Gentry is a village in Gentry County, Missouri, United States. The population was 56 at the 2020 census.

History
Gentry was platted in 1899 by the railroad. Gentry was named from Gentry County, which was named for Richard Gentry, a hero of the Seminole Wars.

Geography
Gentry is located on the west bank of the Middle Fork of the Grand River.

Demographics

2010 census
As of the census of 2010, there were 72 people, 29 households, and 18 families living in the village. The racial makeup of the village was 98.6% White and 1.4% from two or more races.

There were 29 households, of which 34.5% had children under the age of 18 living with them, 51.7% were married couples living together, 10.3% had a female householder with no husband present, and 37.9% were non-families. 34.5% of all households were made up of individuals. The average household size was 2.48 and the average family size was 3.17.

The median age in the village was 36.3 years. 27.8% of residents were under the age of 18; 9.7% were between the ages of 18 and 24; 26.4% were from 25 to 44; 26.4% were from 45 to 64; and 9.7% were 65 years of age or older. The gender makeup of the village was 50.0% male and 50.0% female.

2000 census
As of the census of 2000, there were 101 people, 34 households, and 22 families living in the village. The population density was 445.7 people per square mile (169.5/km2). There were 44 housing units at an average density of 194.2 per square mile (73.9/km2). The racial makeup of the village was 100.00% White.

There were 34 households, out of which 38.2% had children under the age of 18 living with them, 41.2% were married couples living together, 17.6% had a female householder with no husband present, and 32.4% were non-families. 32.4% of all households were made up of individuals, and 5.9% had someone living alone who was 65 years of age or older. The average household size was 2.97 and the average family size was 3.78.

In the village, the population was spread out, with 44.6% under the age of 18, 5.0% from 18 to 24, 27.7% from 25 to 44, 14.9% from 45 to 64, and 7.9% who were 65 years of age or older. The median age was 26 years. For every 100 females, there were 106.1 males. For every 100 females age 18 and over, there were 107.4 males.

The median income for a household in the village was $20,000, and the median income for a family was $28,750. Males had a median income of $28,750 versus $15,625 for females. The per capita income for the village was $8,501. There were 25.0% of families and 17.1% of the population living below the poverty line, including 10.4% of under eighteens and none of those over 64.

Notable people
Avery Kier
Homer Summa

References

External links
 Historic maps of Gentry in the Sanborn Maps of Missouri Collection at the University of Missouri

Villages in Gentry County, Missouri
Villages in Missouri